King You of Chu (died 228 BC) was from 237 to 228 BC the king of the state of Chu during the late Warring States period of ancient China.  He was born Xiong Han and King You was his posthumous title.

He succeeded his father King Kaolie of Chu and during his reign You's maternal uncle Li Yuan served as prime minister.

In 235 BCE, after an attack on the State of Zhao, troops from the states of Qin and Wei united to attack Chu but suffered a defeat.

In March 228 BCE, King You of Chu died and was succeeded by his younger brother Xiong You, who would later be styled King Ai of Chu.

It is rumoured that King You of Chu was actually the illegitimate son of Lord Chunshen.

In the 1930s his tomb at Shou County, Anhui Province was destroyed by warlords, and many artifacts were dispersed, but a great bronze cauldron or ding called 楚大鼎 was preserved and is on display in Anhui Museum.

References

Monarchs of Chu (state)
Chinese kings
3rd-century BC Chinese monarchs
228 BC deaths
Year of birth unknown